The John A. O'Farrell House is a combination of Colonial Revival and Queen Anne styles designed by N. W. Bower and built in Boise, Idaho, in 1892. The house was constructed for John A. O'Farrell, one of Boise City's first residents.

The  house has four bedrooms and four bathrooms, and it was listed for sale in 2017 at $924,900. The front fence separating the house from West Franklin Street was constructed from a balustrade salvaged from the Dewey Palace Hotel (1903), demolished (1963) in Nampa, Idaho. Original cost of the house in 1892 was $8000.

The house was listed on the National Register of Historic Places September 4, 1979.

See also
John A. O'Farrell Cabin

References

External links

 Idaho Architecture Project: O'Farrell House

Buildings and structures in Boise, Idaho
Houses on the National Register of Historic Places in Idaho